Imma ciniata is a moth in the family Immidae. It was described by Druce in 1898. It is found in Panama.

The forewings are brownish-black, thickly spotted all over with grey and with a black fringe. The hindwings are very dark brown, slightly paler at the base.

References

Moths described in 1898
Immidae
Moths of Central America